Gudluru is a Mandal in Nellore district of the Indian state of Andhra Pradesh. It is the mandal headquarters of Gudluru mandal in Kandukur revenue division.

Politics 
Kandukur is an Assembly Constituency in Andhra Pradesh.
rtutu6uqwertyuytr

References

Villages in Prakasam district
Mandal headquarters in Prakasam district